Together in Concert and similar names may refer to:

 Together in Concert: Live, a 2000 live album by Tim Finn, Bic Runga, and Dave Dobbyn
 John Farnham & Tom Jones – Together in Concert, a 1990s concert tour and 2005 live album
 Together In Concert, a 1975 live album by Arlo Guthrie and Pete Seeger
 Juntos en concierto 2006 (translation: "Together in Concert 2006"), a concert tour by Marc Anthony, Laura Pausini and Marco Antonio Solís